Antonio Salvador (born 21 March 1968) is a Spanish former cyclist. He competed in the points race at the 1988 Summer Olympics.

References

External links
 

1968 births
Living people
Spanish male cyclists
Olympic cyclists of Spain
Cyclists at the 1988 Summer Olympics
Cyclists from Madrid